Laurel Meadow is a historic home located near Mechanicsville, Hanover County, Virginia. It was built about 1820, and is a  -story, hall-parlor-plan house in the Federal style.  The house sits on a brick foundation, has a gable roof with dormers, and exterior end chimneys. Also on the property are a contributing one-room schoolhouse and a barn.

It was listed on the National Register of Historic Places in 1995.

References

Houses on the National Register of Historic Places in Virginia
Federal architecture in Virginia
Houses completed in 1820
Houses in Hanover County, Virginia
National Register of Historic Places in Hanover County, Virginia